Noba is a term found in a number of historical sources discussing ancient and Medieval Nubia. Its exact meaning is uncertain, with ancient sources themselves seeming confused about the region south of Egypt. Most likely it refers to two separate groups: the Nuba, a people from southeast of Nubia, and a people later known as the Nobatae, a group of unknown origin who invaded Nubia during the decline of Meroe and most likely founded the kingdom of Nobatia and gave their name to Nubia itself.

References
Lobban, Richard. "Noba." Historical dictionary of ancient and medieval Nubia. Scarecrow Press, c2004

History of Nubia
Medieval Egypt

es:Noba